Central Punjab cricket team is a
− first-class cricket team in Pakistan. The team with five other new teams was introduced as a part of new domestic structure by
− Pakistan Cricket Board (PCB) on 31 August 2019.

2019 squads
On 3 September 2019, PCB announced both First XI and Second XI squads of the team. Babar Azam was announced as captain of the team's First XI, while Ali Waqas was named as Second XI's captain for the season.

First XI

 Babar Azam (c)
 Ahmed Shehzad (vc)
 Azhar Ali
 Hasan Ali
 Ahmed Bashir
 Ali Shan
 Bilal Asif
 Ehsan Adil
 Fahim Ashraf
 Kamran Akmal (wk)
 Mohammad Saad
 Naseem Shah
 Rizwan Hussain 
 Saad Nasim
 Salman Butt
 Umar Akmal
 Usman Salahuddin
 Waqas Maqsood
 Zafar Gohar
 Nasir Nawaz
 Nauman Anwar
 Usman Qadir

Second XI

 Ali Waqas (c)
 Abdullah Shafique
 Ahmed Safi Abdullah
 Aizaz Cheema (mentor)
 Ali Zaryab
 Asad Raza
 Atiq-ur-Rehman
 Ayaz Tasawwar
 Bilawal Iqbal
 Farhan Khan (wk)
 Irfan Khan
 Muhammad Akhlaq
 Mohammad Ali
 Raza Ali Dar
 Suleman Shafqat
 Zahid Mansoor

2020 Squads
Team management retained several of their players in both First XI and Second XI from the previous year's squads. Pakistan's Test and ODI opening batsman Abid Ali was included in this year's squad and some of the Second XI players from last year were selected in First XI squad as a reward for their excellent performances, and some were demoted in team's Second XI.

First XI

 Abid Ali
 Azhar Ali
 Babar Azam
 Naseem Shah
 Kamran Akmal (wk)
 Salman Butt
 Ahmed Shehzad
 Usman Salahuddin
 Rizwan Hussain
 Abdullah Shafique
 Ali Zaryab
 Fahim Ashraf
 Hasan Ali
 Ahmed Bashir
 Zafar Gohar
 Usman Qadir
 Bilal Asif
 Ehsan Adil
 Waqas Maqsood
 Mohammad Saad 
 Saad Nasim
 Suleman Shafqat
 Mohammad Ali
 Bilawal Iqbal
 Irfan Khan
 Muhammad Akhlaq
 Farhan Khan (wk)
 Ahmed Safi Abdullah
 Muhammad Bin Pasha

Second XI
 Ali Shan
 Nauman Anwar
 Raza Ali Dar

References

Central Punjab cricketers